The Ken River is one of the major rivers in the Bundelkhand region of central India and flows through the states of Madhya Pradesh and Uttar Pradesh. It is a tributary of the Yamuna.

Course

The Ken River originates near the village Ahirgawan on the north-west slopes of Barner Range in Katni district and travels a distance of 427 km, before merging with the Yamuna at Chilla village, district Banda in Uttar Pradesh at 

Ken has an overall drainage basin of 28,058 km2, out of which 12,620 km2 belong to Sonar River its largest tributary, whose entire basin lies in Madhya Pradesh; and along its  course it receives water from its own tributaries such as Bawas, Dewar, Kaith and Baink on the left bank, and Kopra and Bearma of the right.

Crossing the Bijawar-Panna hills, the Ken River cuts a 60 km long, and 150–180 m deep gorge. Several streams join the Ken in this gorge making waterfalls. The Ken valley separates the Rewa Plateau from the Satna Plateau.

Tourist attraction

The Raneh Falls on the Ken river and Ken Ghariyal Sanctuary are tourist attractions. The rocks formed here present different hues and are made of Granite, Dolomite and Quartz.
Gangau Dam has been constructed at the confluence of the Ken and Simri rivers. The Ken River passes through Panna National Park.

The banks of the Ken River have quite a few castles which were used by the Rajputs of this region. Nowadays, some of these castles are occupied by dacoits and are a cause for worry for the local police. These castles are in such a state of ruin that the walls are difficult to see from below the hill they are built on and ruins of only key buildings still exist. Some of these castles make for a good trek.

It is famous for the rare semi-precious stone known as Shahjar or Shazar , a transparent form of the mineral Agate containing  dendrites. Banda city is located on banks of river Ken.

References

Rivers of Madhya Pradesh
Rivers of Uttar Pradesh
Tributaries of the Yamuna River
Rivers of India